Haplochromis paucidens is a species of fish in the family Cichlidae. It is found in the Democratic Republic of the Congo and Rwanda. Its natural habitat is freshwater lakes.

References

paucidens
Fish described in 1921
Taxonomy articles created by Polbot